Hanford is the largest city and county seat of Kings County, California, located in the San Joaquin Valley region of the greater Central Valley. The population was 53,967 at the 2010 census.

History

Today's Hanford was once north of Tulare Lake, historically the largest body of fresh water west of the Mississippi River. The area was inhabited by the Tachi Yokuts Indians for several thousand years prior to Euro-American contact. They occupied locations along watercourses such as creeks, springs and seep areas (such as sloughs), along perennial and seasonal drainages, as well as flat ridges and terraces.

Since the annexation of California after the Mexican-American War, the locality was settled by Americans and immigrants as farmland, broadly referred to as "Mussel Slough". The earliest dated grave in the area was that of a young Alice Spangler who was initially buried in the Kings River Cemetery just north of her family's farm in 1860. As the settlement grew, Tulare Lake's feeding rivers were diverted for agricultural irrigation, causing it to gradually shrink and, over the 19th and 20th centuries, effectively become extinct.

From the mid-to-late 1870s, the Southern Pacific Railroad planned to lay tracks towards the developing farmland west of Visalia, spurring a growth in labor and population. Hanford's namesake was James Madison Hanford, an executive for the company. The earliest known document labeling the settlement as "Hanford" is an 1876 map of Tulare County which once included the territory of present-day Kings County. Tracks were laid through a sheep camp in 1877. According to History of Kings County: "It was but a short step from sheep-camp to village and with the railroad as an attraction the village flourished and became a town within a few historic months." Many of those working on the tracks were Chinese immigrants.

In 1877, Hanford began to appear in state newspapers, giving details of events in the town's early days. In 1878, Hanford began running their own newspaper service and wiring called "The Public Good" which fed into other papers. In May 1878, Hanford residents drafted a resolve against the South Pacific Railroad from purchasing land with residing settlers. In June 1878, the Workingmen's Party was reported to have a majority vote over the Democrats in the town.

In May 1878, the Upper Kings River Canal and Irrigation Company filed articles of incorporation. On August 1, California Governor candidates George Clement Perkins and Romualdo Pacheco (and on August 10, O F Thornton and W F White W P C) spoke in Hanford and Lemoore.

This event became famous as the Mussel Slough Tragedy. The next month, the town's first census was held counting some 269 residents. Forty-four of them were Chinese immigrants who resided in what's known today as China Alley.

A post office was established in 1887.

On several occasions, major fires destroyed much of the young community's business district. The need for fire protection led to the town becoming an incorporated city in 1891. Its first mayor was local resident Yamon LeBaron.

An electrical generating plant was built in 1891 by pioneering flour miller H.G. Lacey, bringing the first electric lights to the city. The Lacey Milling Company was still operating in Hanford in 2016.

The first public high school, Hanford Union High School, was started in 1892 with one teacher, W. S. Cranmer, and an average enrollment of fourteen.

When Kings County was created in 1893 from the western part of Tulare County, Hanford became its county seat.

A second railroad was laid through Hanford in 1897, which today is the main north–south line of the BNSF Railway through the San Joaquin Valley. The original east–west Southern Pacific Railroad branch line is now operated by the San Joaquin Valley Railroad.

In 1903, steel magnate and philanthropist Andrew Carnegie donated $12,500 for the construction of the Hanford Carnegie Library which opened in 1906 (and is now the Carnegie Museum of Kings County).

Saloons flourished in Hanford's early days despite an anti-saloon movement until the town voted to become "dry" in 1912, eight years before nationwide Prohibition was enacted.

In the 1930s, famed pilot Amelia Earhart lived in Hanford to teach flying lessons at Fresno Chandler Airport. She befriended local resident and student of hers Mary Packwood with whom she gifted a personally-designed dress and left luggage shortly before her disappearance in the Pacific Ocean in 1937. The belongings are on display in Hanford's Carnegie Museum.

Geography

Hanford is located at  (36.3275, −119.6457). The only natural watercourse is Mussel Slough, remnants of which still exist on the city's western edge. The People's Ditch, an irrigation canal dug in the 1870s, traverses Hanford from north to south.

Climate
Hanford's land was once a drainage basin for Tulare Lake. Today it has a climate typical of the San Joaquin Valley floor with hot, dry summers and cool winters characterized by dense Tule fog. The wetter season occurs from November through March.

The National Weather Service Forecast Office for the San Joaquin Valley is in Hanford and includes a Doppler weather radar. Weather forecasts and climatological information for Hanford and the surrounding area are available from its official website.

Notes

Demographics

2010

The 2010 United States Census reported that Hanford had a population of 53,967. The racial makeup of Hanford was 33,713 (62.5%) White, 2,632 (4.9%) African American, 712 (1.3%) Native American, 2,322 (4.3%) Asian, 53 (0.1%) Pacific Islander, 11,599 (21.5%) from other races, and 2,936 (5.4%) from two or more races. Hispanic or Latino of any race were 25,419 persons (47.1%).

The Census reported that 53,068 people (98.3% of the population) lived in households, 283 (0.5%) lived in non-institutionalized group quarters, and 616 (1.1%) were institutionalized.

There were 17,492 households, out of which 8,053 (46.0%) had children under the age of 18 living in them, 9,088 (52.0%) were married couples living together, 2,833 (16.2%) had a female householder with no husband present, 1,207 (6.9%) had a male householder with no wife present.  There were 1,315 (7.5%) unmarried partnerships, and 117 (0.7%) same-sex partnerships. 3,483 households (19.9%) were made up of individuals, and 1,405 (8.0%) had someone living alone who was 65 years of age or older. The average household size was 3.03.  There were 13,128 families (75.1% of all households); the average family size was 3.49.

The population was spread out, with 16,731 people (31.0%) under the age of 18, 5,478 people (10.2%) aged 18 to 24, 14,764 people (27.4%) aged 25 to 44, 11,647 people (21.6%) aged 45 to 64, and 5,347 people (9.9%) who were 65 years of age or older.  The median age was 30.9 years. For every 100 females, there were 96.3 males.  For every 100 females age 18 and over, there were 93.9 males.

The homeowner vacancy rate was 2.4%; the rental vacancy rate was 4.6%.  31,109 people (57.6% of the population) lived in owner-occupied housing units and 21,959 people (40.7%) lived in rental housing units.

15.5% of the populace lived below the poverty line.

2000

 there were 41,686 people, 13,931 households, and 10,378 families residing in the city. The racial makeup of the city was 64.1% White, 5.0% Black or African American, 1.4% Native American, 2.9% Asian, 0.2% Pacific Islander, 20.8% from other races, and 5.7% from two or more races. 38.7% of the population were Hispanic or Latino of any race.

Foreign-born residents accounted for 13.2% of Hanford's population and 28.3% spoke a language other than English at home.

There were 13,931 households, out of which 42.3% had children under the age of 18 living with them, 53.9% were married couples living together, 15.4% had a female householder with no husband present, and 25.5% were non-families. 20.6% of all households were made up of individuals, and 8.7% had someone living alone who was 65 years of age or older. The average household size was 2.93 and the average family size was 3.39.

In the city, the population was spread out, with 31.6% under the age of 18, 9.8% from 18 to 24, 29.6% from 25 to 44, 18.6% from 45 to 64, and 10.3% who were 65 years of age or older. The median age was 31 years. For every 100 females, there were 95.9 males. For every 100 females age 18 and over, there were 92.3 males.

Economy

Hanford is a major trading center serving the surrounding agricultural area. According to the California Employment Development Department, as of September 2012, most residents of the Hanford-Corcoran Metropolitan Statistical Area were employed in services (31,000 employees), government (14,400 employees) and farming (6,400 employees) as well as in some manufacturing enterprises (5,700 employees).

The heavy industry sector has declined significantly over the past 30 years. An oil refinery formerly operated in the city under several different owners (Caminol Oil Co. from 1932 to 1967, Beacon Oil Co. from 1967 to 1982 and Ultramar Oil Co. from 1982 to 1987) until it permanently closed in 1987. A tire manufacturing plant was built in 1962 by the Armstrong Rubber Co., which operated it until that company was purchased by the Italian manufacturer Pirelli, which eventually closed the factory in 2001.  In August 2017, Faraday Future announced that it had signed a lease for the former Pirelli plant where it plans to manufacture electric vehicles. The company said that it could employ up to 1,300 people over time and build up to 10,000 cars a year.

Major employers within the city of Hanford in 2006 included the Kings County government with 1,041 employees, the Adventist Health with 857, the Hanford Elementary School District with 520, the Del Monte Foods tomato cannery with 435 year-round and 1,500 seasonal employees and Marquez Brothers International, Inc., makers of Hispanic cheese and other dairy products. Many Hanford residents work for other nearby employers such as NAS Lemoore, the U.S. Navy's largest Master Jet Base located  WSW of Hanford and for the California Department of Corrections and Rehabilitation which operates three state prisons in Kings County.

The city was impacted by the Great Recession (2007–09) and employment was also affected by the California drought (2012–13). The unemployment rate in January 2016 was 10.3%. However, the rate had dropped to 7.9% in February 2020 at the eve of the COVID-19 pandemic. The unemployment rate had risen to 16.0% in April of that year.  According to the United States Census Bureau, median household income in Hanford was $54,767 and 18.3% of the population was living below the poverty line in 2008–2012.

Arts and culture

The Kings Art Center was opened in 1989 to be the premier visual arts gallery and art training center of Kings County. It hosts gallery showings throughout the year, as well as art classes for adults and children.

The Kings District Fair is a traditional county fair held on four days in mid-June at the Kings Fairgrounds. The Renaissance of Kings Cultural Arts Faire is held the first weekend of October at Courthouse Square in Hanford's city center. The event typically attracts 15,000 people over the two-day period.

The Kings Symphony Orchestra was founded in 1963 and draws musicians from throughout the central and southern San Joaquin Valley. The orchestra generally performs four times a year.

The Hanford Carnegie Museum was built in 1905 as one of the many Carnegie libraries that were funded by the steel industry magnate, Andrew Carnegie. The library was replaced by a new structure at a different location in 1968. The old library was later renovated and re-opened as the Hanford Carnegie Museum in 1975.

The former Clark Center for Japanese Art and Culture had the mission of collecting, preserving and exhibiting works of fine art, primarily the arts of Japan. The center also housed a specialist library for Japanese art and culture. The Clark Center closed permanently on June 30, 2015. The art collection was moved to the Minneapolis Institute of Arts and the bonsai collection was transferred to the Shinzen Friendship Garden at Woodward Park in Fresno, California.

Chinese immigrants that arrived in the late 19th century created a thriving Chinatown in Hanford in the neighborhood around China Alley. China Alley was the site of the famous but now closed Imperial Dynasty restaurant. Hanford's Taoist Temple (listed on the National Register of Historic Places) built in 1893 is also there. A Moon Festival is held in China Alley in early October. In July 2011, Hanford city council commissioned a study of China Alley with the hope of revitalizing it. The China Alley Preservation Society is a non profit organization dedicated to preserving and revitalizing China Alley.

Sports
Hanford is the site of the Hanford Criterium bicycle races held on a Sunday in late March or early April. The  hourglass style loop course is run on downtown streets. The Criterium is held under USA Cycling racing rules and permit.

Dirt track auto racing takes place at the Kings Speedway from March through October. The track is a 3/8-mile semi-banked clay oval and is at the Kings Fairgrounds.

Government

Hanford is incorporated as a general law city under the California Constitution. The city has a council-manager government with a city manager appointed by the city council.

The city council is made up of five members elected by districts for four-year terms. There are no term limits in effect. The mayor and vice mayor are elected annually by the city council from among its members. Council members include former mayors Lou Martinez, Diane Sharp, Kalish Marrow, and Hanford Vice Mayor Mark Kairis. The current mayor is teacher and former Hanford Planning Commission Vice Chair Travis Paden following the 2022 California elections.

Hanford's city manager is the chief administrative officer of the city and is responsible for the overall administrative direction of the city. The city manager's duties include development and implementation of the annual budget for approval by the city council. Mario Cifuentez II was appointed as the city manager in 2019.

In the state legislature, Hanford is in the 14th State Senate District, which is represented by Democrat Melissa Hurtado, and in the 32nd State Assembly District, represented by Democrat Rudy Salas. The north side of Hanford is represented by Republican David Valadao, with the south side represented by Republican Kevin McCarthy.

Education

Hanford has 15 elementary schools, three junior high schools, four high schools with a total of 8,464 Kindergarten through 8th grade students and 3,522 high schoolers.

The Hanford Elementary School District provides kindergarten through eighth grade education for most of the city. The Pioneer Union Elementary School District serves much of the northern part of Hanford. Part of north Hanford is served by the Kings River-Hardwick School District. The Hanford Joint Union High School District provides public secondary education. It operates Hanford Union High School, Hanford West High School, Sierra Pacific High School as well as Earl F. Johnson High School.

The College of the Sequoias operates an education center in Hanford as part of the Joint Educational Center that includes Sierra Pacific High School.

Brandman University has a Hanford campus for adult students.

Transportation 
Kings Area Regional Transit (KART) operates regularly scheduled fixed route bus service, vanpool service for commuters and Dial-A-Ride (demand response) services throughout Kings County as well as to Fresno. Hanford is also served by Orange Belt Stages.

Rail 
Amtrak provides passenger rail service from Hanford station to the San Francisco Bay Area and Sacramento, and service to Southern California by a combination of rail and bus. Freight service is available from both the BNSF Railway and the San Joaquin Valley Railroad.

The American Recovery and Reinvestment Act of 2009-funded California High-Speed Rail has proposed a station. However, the proposed station on the eastern outskirts of Hanford is listed as "optional" and will not be built without matching local funds or in-kind support.

Air
The Hanford Municipal Airport serves general aviation and has a  paved runway.

Utilities

Water
Formerly, the water had contained naturally occurring arsenic in excess of the maximum contaminant level adopted by the U.S. Environmental Protection Agency. However, according to the Consumer Confidence Report issued by the city of Hanford in March 2010 for calendar year 2009, since November 2009, the city has supplied water that is below the federal standard of 10 micrograms of arsenic per liter of water. Although it does not pose a health hazard, Hanford's drinking water also naturally contains hydrogen sulfide, which caused the water to have a noticeable "rotten egg" odor. In February 2015, the city completed a project to chlorinate all of its water, to eliminate the odor.

Sanitation
The wastewater treatment plant treats  of sewage per day. The treated effluent is used to irrigate non-food crops.

Sister city
 Setana, Hokkaido, Japan

Notable people

Leslie Bassett was a Pulitzer Prize-winning composer who was born in Hanford.
Ryan Bowen was a baseball player for the Houston Astros and Florida Marlins who was born in and attended high school in Hanford.
Ken Caminiti was a Major League Baseball player and National League MVP who was born in Hanford.
Tyson Chandler is a basketball player in the National Basketball Association (NBA) who was born in Hanford and grew up on a small farm there.
Chris Cohan, a Cable TV executive; former owner of the Golden State Warriors, born in Hanford
Calvin M. Dooley graduated from Hanford Union High School in 1972 and served in the U.S. House of Representatives from 1991 to 2005.
Dameane Douglas was a wide receiver in the National Football League (NFL) who was born in Hanford.
Harlan F. Hagen lived in Hanford and served in the U.S. House of Representatives from 1953 to 1967.
Jermaine Haley is a football player who was born in Hanford.
Tyler Henry, a self-proclaimed psychic medium with a 2016 E! reality series, grew up in Hanford.
Ed Hill, songwriter and musician
Tamara Keith, radio reporter, host and producer, was raised in Hanford.
Bill Landis, baseball player on the 1967 American League champion Boston Red Sox.
Mark Lee was a cornerback in the National Football League who played for the Green Bay Packers and was born in Hanford.
Melinda Lira, American Idol season 5 semi-finalist, was born in Hanford.
Pauline Lord, actress, was born in Hanford.
Ruth MacLeod, writer, born in Hanford.
Chad Mendes, UFC fighter.
May Merrill Miller, an American writer best known for her novel First the Blade which offers a unique view of the domestic life of California pioneers as well as on the Mussel Slough Tragedy, was born in Hanford.
Richard C. Miller, photographer, a native of Hanford.
Lorenzo Neal, a 3-time Pro Bowl fullback in the NFL, was born in Hanford.
Scott Parker, one of the few California-born hockey players to play in the NHL.
Sean Parnell, former Governor of Alaska, was born in Hanford.
Steve Perry is a rock singer with the band Journey who was born in Hanford.
Slim Pickens, cowboy and actor, grew up in Hanford.
Phillip Pine, actor, was born in Hanford.
Poor Man's Poison, American folk band based in Hanford.
Jessica Gao, television writer and producer, was born in Hanford.
J. G. Quintel, creator of Regular Show, was born in Hanford and went to Hanford High School.
James Rainwater, physicist and co-winner of the 1975 Nobel Prize in Physics, lived in Hanford as a child and graduated from Hanford High School.
Matt Shively, actor on True Jackson, VP, was born and grew up in Hanford.
Bill Simas, pitcher for the Chicago White Sox, was born in Hanford.
Jewerl Thomas is a former professional National Football League football player who played running back for five seasons for the Los Angeles Rams, Kansas City Chiefs, and San Diego Chargers   He graduated from Hanford High School.
David Valadao, elected to the U.S House of Representatives in 2012, was born and raised in Hanford.
Andy Vidak, State Senator from the 16th district, currently lives in Hanford.
Jan-Michael Vincent, actor, moved to Hanford with his family as a teenager, and graduated from Hanford High School.
Cornelius Warmerdam, longtime pole vault world record holder, grew up in Hanford.
Darrell Winfield is an actor who played the Marlboro man and was born in Hanford.
Delbert Wong (1920–2006), first judge of Chinese-American descent in the continental United States, was born in Hanford.

References

External links

 
 Hanford Chamber of Commerce website
 Hanford Sentinel newspaper website

 
Cities in Kings County, California
County seats in California
Incorporated cities and towns in California
San Joaquin Valley